Baxterley Church is situated at the western side of the parish of Baxterley, Warwickshire, towards Wood End, and dates from the 12th century.

History
This small grade II listed parish church is of square plan. The windows in the c. 12th–century chancel are small. The church has been extended in the 13th, 14th and 19th–centuries. The font is 15th–century.

The church dates from Norman times and was built around 1200 AD with additions built throughout its life. The foundations of the nave Date from the 14th century. The base of the small tower was built around 1540 but the top section is early 17th century. The church was extensively rebuilt c. 1875 by Paull and Bickerdike.
	
Hugh Latimer, Bishop of Oxford, preached a sermon at Baxterley Church on Christmas Day 1552. His niece, Mary Glover, lived nearby in Mancetter.

A 13th century wooden crozier head was found embedded in the wall in 1958; it is the oldest piece of church equipment in Warwickshire.

Profile
It is a small stone-built country church with a nave chancel and small tower. It is surrounded by a graveyard which contains a war grave of an airman of World War II.

It is part of the Kingsbury and Baxterley group of churches along with Kingsbury, Merevale, Hurley and Wood End. All five share the same Priest In Charge, who is currently Revd. Dr John White.

It is part of the Deanery of Polesworth, which is part of the Archdeaconry of Aston.

References

Footnotes

Notes

Bibliography

External links

A church Near you
Information From Baxterley.com

Church of England church buildings in Warwickshire
Wood End, Atherstone